The ZEW – Leibniz Centre for European Economic Research (ZEW) in Mannheim is an economic research institute and a member of the Gottfried Wilhelm Leibniz Scientific Community. Under the leadership of Prof. Achim Wambach, PhD, president of the Institute, and Thomas Kohl, managing director, ZEW employs a staff of about 208. ZEW is one of Europe’s leading economic research institutes.

ZEW is subdivided into the eight research fields:
Labour Markets and Social Insurance 
Economics of Innovation and Industrial Dynamics
Digital Economy
Pensions and Sustainable Financial Markets
Environmental and Climate Economics
Corporate Taxation and Public Finance
Inequality and Public Policy
Market Design

and one Research Group: Health Care Markets and Health Policy

ZEW’s guiding mission is to study the optimal performance of markets and institutions in Europe. ZEW’s expertise lies particularly in the area of applied microeconometrics and in computable general equilibrium models. Research findings are presented at conferences and published in scientific journals. ZEW also contributes to current political and economic discussions by issuing a variety of its own publications. Furthermore, it is offering seminars.

Special attention is paid to the monthly published ZEW Indicator of Economic Sentiment. It is a leading indicator for the German economy. The survey also asks for the expectations for the Eurozone, Japan, Great Britain, Italy, France and the US.

ZEW is funded in part by the Federal State of Baden-Württemberg. Since 2005, the Institute has also received basic funding from a partnership between the German federal and state governments. More than 40 per cent of the Institute’s financial resources are obtained from research contracts for third parties, including the European Commission, ministries, and institutions of the federal and state governments, as well as companies, associations, and local authorities. As a member of the Leibniz Scientific Community, also known as the Leibniz Association, ZEW gained recognition from the association's Senate on the basis of a strong 2009 evaluation.

Attention to indicators
The March, 2012, edition of the Indicator of Economic Sentiment, which compiled survey results from 285 analysts, found a notable increase in German sentiment. Another of the several measures in the survey—of the "Current economic situation"—showed little change in the month, while inflation expectations rose sharply. The indicator showed an "unexpected rise in April [2012] for a fifth straight monthly gain. The indicator rose to 23.4 from 22.3 in March, against expectations for a decline to 20.0", a result which upon release was cited relative to gains in European stock markets in mid-month.

References

Economic research institutes
Research institutes in Germany